Highlands Region is one of four regions of Papua New Guinea.

Subdivision
The Region is administratively divided into seven provinces:
Chimbu (Simbu)
Eastern Highlands
Enga
Hela
Jiwaka
Southern Highlands
Western Highlands

See also

 Provinces of Papua New Guinea

References

 
Regions of Papua New Guinea
Highlands